Money Hungry is a reality TV weight loss competition show based on bet dieting, with twelve teams of two competing for a $100,000 prize made up from team contributions.

Contestants

Weigh-ins and eliminations

 The team won the competition.
 The team was the Big Heavies and was immune from elimination.
 The team was saved from elimination by the Big Heavies.
 The team lost the challenge and was put up for elimination.
 The team received the most votes and was put up for elimination, but lost the most percentage of weight at the weigh-in compared to the others.
 The team received the most votes and was eliminated for having lost the least percentage of weight at the weigh-in compared to the others.
 The team lost the challenge, was put up for elimination, and was eliminated for having lost the least percentage of weight at the weigh-in compared to the others.
 The team had the lowest percentage of weight lost and was eliminated.

Episodes
Episode 1 - "Put Your Money Where Your Mouth Is"

First aired 2 August 2010

Our first introduction to the teams, the show opens with the contestants being forced off the cushy bus and made to hike up the hill to the house.
 Bottom 2 Teams: Family-Sized, Flabulous
 Eliminated: Family-Sized

Episode 2 - "All's Fair in Love and Weight Loss"

First aired 9 August 2010

Scheming begins, and a school-boy crush Josh has on Jamie threatens his alliances.
 Big Heavies (Challenge Winner): A Pair of Nuts
 Saved by the Big Heavies: Mission Slimpossible
 Bottom Teams: Double Chocolate, Roll Models
 Eliminated: Roll Models

Episode 3 - "Welcome to the Family"

First aired 16 August 2010

After half the house (Slimpossible, Nuts, Chicago, Grading and Rocker Moms) bands together as "The Orphanage", the other half counters and becomes "The Family".
 Big Heavies (Challenge Winner): Mission Slimpossible
 Saved by the Big Heavies: A Pair of Nuts
 Bottom Teams: Flabulous, No Excuses, Rocker Moms
 Eliminated: Rocker Moms

Episode 4 - "Bust a Move"

First aired 23 August 2010

Tempers flare and things get heated when the Regulators and Mission Slimpossible get physical.
 Big Heavies (Challenge Winner): The Regulators
 Saved by the Big Heavies: Double Chocolate
 Bottom Teams: A Pair of Nuts, Mission Slimpossible
 Eliminated: A Pair of Nuts

Episode 5 - "The Way The Cookie Crumbles"

First aired 30 August 2010
No house vote this week leads everyone to butter up to the Big Heavies, who turn the tables by saving no one, and Josh turns his affections toward Stephanie.
 Big Heavies (Challenge Winner): The Regulators
 Eliminated: Chicago Deep Dish

Episode 6 - "The Puzzle Master"

First aired 6 September 2010

The teams are thrown a curve when the week's challenge is not only physical, but mental as well.
 Big Heavies (Challenge Winner): Slenderellas
 Saved by the Big Heavies: Flabulous
 Bottom Teams: Grading Curves, Mission Slimpossible, No Excuses
 Eliminated: No Excuses

Episode 7 - "This Means War"

First aired 13 September 2010

The joy of being at the Rose Bowl stadium is diminished by the challenge: running up and down the stairs, transporting 100 footballs. Alliances shift as teams claim deals were made earlier.
 Big Heavies (Challenge Winner): Mission Slimpossible
 Saved by the Big Heavies: Grading Curves
 Bottom Teams: Double Chocolate, Slenderellas 
 Eliminated: Double Chocolate

Episode 8 - "A Kitty With 9 Lives"

First aired 20 September 2010

Another puzzle throws off some of the teams. Phillip plays both sides to try and save his team from elimination.
 Big Heavies (Challenge Winner): Mission Slimpossible
 Bottom Teams: Flabulous, Slenderellas 
 Eliminated: Flabulous

Episode 9 - "Photo Finish"

First aired 27 September 2010

One team attempts to vote themselves into the bottom in order to eliminate another.
 Big Heavies (Challenge Winner): Grading Curves
 Eliminated: Slenderellas

Episode 10 - "The Ultimate Weigh-In" and Finale

First aired 4 October 2010

In the final challenge, Tricia suffers an injury that puts Grading Curves out of the running.  In a surprise gesture of team solidarity, Mission Slimpossible (after getting it back along with the Regulators) give their entry fee to Grading Curves.
 Big Heavies (Challenge Winner): Mission Slimpossible
 Eliminated: Grading Curves

Families gather as the last two teams weigh in and the winner is decided.
Final Weigh-In Winners: Mission Slimpossible

Episode Progress

Pounds Lost

References

External links

VH1 original programming
2010 American television series debuts
Fitness reality television series
2010s American reality television series
2010 American television series endings
English-language television shows